Otto Sackur (28 September 1880 in Breslau, Germany – 17 December 1914 in Berlin, Germany) was a German physical chemist.

He is known for the development of the Sackur–Tetrode equation, which he developed independently of Hugo Tetrode. His and Tetrode's names are also combined to name the Sackur–Tetrode constant derived using the equation.

Sackur studied at the University of Breslau, receiving his doctorate there in 1901. He then worked in London before joining the Fritz Haber Institute in Berlin. He died in an explosion after mixing two chemicals.

References

External links
 

1880 births
1914 deaths
Accidental deaths in Germany
20th-century German chemists
Scientists from Wrocław
People from the Province of Silesia